Boudry railway station is a railway station in the municipality of Boudry, in the Swiss canton of Neuchâtel. It is an intermediate stop on the standard gauge Jura Foot line of Swiss Federal Railways.

Services
The following services stop at Boudry:

References

External links 
 
 

Railway stations in the canton of Neuchâtel
Swiss Federal Railways stations